Livia Avancini (born 8 May 1992) is a Brazilian athlete specialising in the shot put. She has won several medals on continental level.

Her personal bests in the shot put are 17.74 metres outdoors (São Bernardo do Campo 2022 and 17.52 metres indoors (Cochabamba 2022).

International competitions

References

1992 births
Living people
Brazilian female shot putters
South American Championships in Athletics winners
20th-century Brazilian women
21st-century Brazilian women